Ferrimonas marina is a bacterium from the genus of Ferrimonas which has been isolated from alga from Okinawa in Japan.

References

Bacteria described in 2005
Alteromonadales